Benedetto Nerli (died 1565) was a Roman Catholic prelate who served as Bishop of Volterra (1545–1565).

Biography
On 22 June 1545, Benedetto Nerli was appointed during the papacy of Pope Paul III as Bishop of Volterra.
He served as Bishop of Volterra until his death in 1565.

References 

16th-century Italian Roman Catholic bishops
Bishops appointed by Pope Paul III
1565 deaths